Iaz may refer to several places in Romania:

 Iaz, a village in Strugari Commune, Bacău County 
 Iaz, a village in Obreja Commune, Caraș-Severin County 
 Iaz, a village in Plopiș Commune, Sălaj County 
 Iaz, a village in Dornești Commune, Suceava County 
 Iaz, a village in Solești Commune, Vaslui County
 Iaz (Barcău), a tributary of the Barcău in Sălaj County
 Iaz, another name for the river Mândra in Brașov County
 Iaz, a tributary of the Șușița in Gorj County